In planetary geology, a scopulus  (pl. scopuli , from Greek σκόπελος "peak") is a lobate or irregular escarpment.  In the early 1970s, the International Astronomical Union (IAU) adopted scopulus as one of a number of official descriptor terms for topographic features on Mars and other planets and satellites. One justification for using neutral Latin or Greek descriptors was that it allowed features to be named and described before their geology or geomorphology could be determined. Currently, the IAU recognizes 54 descriptor terms (see Planetary nomenclature). Thirteen features with the descriptor term scopulus are present on Mars.

Scopuli on Mars

References

Planetary geology